Firá (pronounced ) is the modern capital of the Greek Aegean island of Santorini (Thera). A traditional settlement, "Firá" derives its name from an alternative pronunciation of "Thíra", the ancient name of the island itself.

The town also hosts a number of churches, including the Cathedral of Ypapanti and the Three Bells of Fira.

Access to Fira is mainly by roads on its eastern side, climbing from its port via the zigzag footpath on foot or on donkeys, or by riding the steep cable car from its lower terminal by the port. The central square of Fira is called Plateia Theotokopoulou, with a bus and taxi station, banks, and pharmacies.

Nikolaos, plus the volcanic island Nea Kameni at the center with Thirassia Island. Large cruise ships anchor in the small harbor between Nea Kameni and Fira.

References

External links

Santorini
Populated places in Thira (regional unit)